The National Federation of Post Office Motor Vehicle Employees (NFPOMVE) was a labor union representing workers for the United States Postal Service.

The union was founded in 1924, as the National Association of Post Office Chauffeurs and Mechanics Union.  On June 10, 1958, it was chartered by the AFL-CIO, and by 1968, it had over 8,000 members.  On July 1, 1971, it merged with the National Association of Special Delivery Messengers, the United Federation of Postal Clerks, the National Association of Post Office and General Services Maintenance Employees, and the National Postal Union, to form the American Postal Workers' Union.

References

Postal trade unions
Trade unions established in 1924
Trade unions disestablished in 1971